Debbie Millman is an American writer, educator, artist, curator, and designer who is best known as the host of the podcast Design Matters. She has authored six books and is the President Emeritus of the American Institute of Graphic Arts (AIGA) and chair, one of only five women to hold the position over 100 years. She co-founded the Masters in Branding Program at the School of Visual Arts in New York City with Steven Heller. She was previously the editorial and creative director of Print magazine. Her illustrations have appeared in many major publications, including New York Magazine, Design Observer, and Fast Company and her artwork has been included in many museums and institutes including the Design Museum of Chicago and the Boston Biennale.

Early life and education 
Millman studied at the University at Albany, SUNY for her undergraduate Bachelor of Arts degree. She majored in English with a minor in Russian literature, graduating in 1983. During her years there, she wrote for the student newspaper, eventually becoming the arts and features editor her senior year. She credits discovering her interest in design through this role where she had to layout and design the paper, finding it to be "truly remarkable, like magical."

Career

1983-1995: Early career, Hot 97 
After school Millman has said that she started working as a designer because it was her only marketable skill, including old-school layout drafting skills. She worked freelance and as a paste-up artist; her first job out of college was in the design department of a cable magazine. A year later she took a job as the director of marketing at a real estate development company, but she hated it.

In 1993, Millman became the off-staff creative director of HOT 97 in New York City, where she worked with Emmis Broadcasting general manager Judy Ellis and Promotion Director Rocco Macri to turn the dance music radio station into a hip-hop radio station. Millman created the HOT 97 logo in 1994 and then redesigned it again in 1999. Millman would remain the creative director for twelve years total until 2005.

Millman has described this time in her career as a series of "experiments in rejection and failure." It took twelve years after graduating college for her to get her first design job at Sterling Brands in 1995. Of this process she has said, "It takes work to get the work you love. There is no other way." She also has said that no matter what job she had during the time period up until 1995, she "was always making art and writing."

1995-2016: Sterling Brands, Design Matters
In 1995, Millman joined Sterling Brands in New York City, where she eventually became a partner, the president of the Design Division, and chief marketing officer. There she worked with brands including Pepsi, Gillette, Colgate, Kimberly-Clark, Nestlé, and the Campbell Soup Company. She worked on the redesign of Burger King, merchandising for Star Wars, and the positioning and branding of the NO MORE movement. In 2008, Millman and her partners sold Sterling Brands to Omnicom and she continued to work there until 2016.

She has served as the editorial & creative director of Print since 2002.

In 2003, Millman was invited to join the AIGA as a board member but was voted off after one year; she then was offered an AIGA juror seat in that year's Graphic Design USA Awards to help soften the blow. This resulted in a very critical blog post of Millman on Speak Up, one of the first design blogs run by Armit Vit and Bryony Gomez-Palacio. She has spoken about how much the experience affected her, though she eventually ended up writing for the site later the same year and continued until it ceased publication in 2009.

In 2004, Millman founded Design Matters, a design podcast where she frequently interviews designers, educators, authors, and thinkers—at a time when the word podcast was not well known. The show started out at VoiceAmerica Business Radio, an internet radio network, where Millman paid them for airtime. In 2009, Bill Drenttel of Design Observer asked her to bring the show over and introduced her to Curtis Fox, who has remained the producer every since.

Design Matters guests have included Massimo Vignelli, Steven Heller, Marian Bantjes, Tina Roth Eisenberg, and Stefan Sagmeister, Milton Glaser, Malcolm Gladwell, Dan Pink, Barbara Kruger, and Seth Godin, among others. On the show, Millman has interviewed over 400 people from the art, design and creative fields since the podcast began.

2016-present: School of Visual Arts, Curation

In 2009, Millman and Steven Heller founded a graduate program in branding at the School of Visual Arts in New York City. She serves as chair of the program. The school's inaugural class wrote and designed the Rockport book Brand Bible: The Complete Guide to Building, Designing and Sustaining Brands, and in 2013 the students designed and created branding for the Museum of Modern Art's retail program, Destination: New York.

Millman became the President Emeritus of American Institute of Graphic Arts (AIGA) in 2014, one of five women to hold the position in the organization's 100-year history. She is a former board member and treasurer of the New York Chapter.

In 2015, the School of Visual Arts began to reposition the Kappa Middle School in Harlem and, in 2016, they rebranded Mariska Hargitay's Joyful Heart Foundation. The class of 2017 redesigned the identity of the Performance Space 122 in New York City.

Throughout her career, Millman has contributed to various media outlets including The New York Times, New York Magazine, Print Magazine, Design Observer and Fast Company. She designed campaign buttons for Hillary Clinton during her 2016 presidential campaign, wrapping paper and beach towels for One Kings Lane, greeting cards for Mohawk Paper and MOO Paper, as well as playing cards for DeckStarter and various others.

In September 2017, she curated a show for the Museum of Design in Atlanta titled Text Me: How We Live In Language, featuring artists and designers including Ed Ruscha, Jean-Michel Basquiat, Shepard Fairey, Neil Gaiman, Deborah Kass and Lesley Dill. Arts Atlanta called the show a bold first curation. Millman co-curated conferences, such as HOW DESIGN LIVE, the 2017 AIGA National Conference. Since 2013, she has curated 30 Covers, 30 Days for National November Writing Month.

Millman is a regular keynote speaker at a variety of global educational institutions, covering topics on design and branding. In the past she has presented keynote lectures at Rotman School of Management, Princeton University, Michigan Modern, the Hong Kong Design Association, the Melbourne Writers Festival, the National Museum of Serbia, Design Thinkers in Toronto, the Festival of Art and Design in Barcelona, Webstock in New Zealand, QVED in Munich, the ING Conference in Dubai, TypoBerlin, the By Design Conference in Slovakia and more.

In 2022, Millman appeared on Storybound reading from her new book, Design Matters.

Reception and awards 
Millman's artwork has been exhibited at the Boston Biennale, Chicago Design Museum, Anderson University, School of Visual Arts, Long Island University, The Wolfsonion Museum and the Czong Institute for Contemporary Art. In the past, she was an artist-in-residence at Cranbrook University, Old Dominion University and Notre Dame University, and has also conducted visual storytelling workshops at the Academy of Art University in San Francisco, the University of Utah, Anderson University, Albuquerque Academy, the High School of Art and Design in Manhattan and the Type Directors Club in New York City.

In 2014, she received the Type Directors Club Certificate of Typographic Excellence for her entry in TDC61, 'Austin Initiative for Graphic Awesomeness' poster. Her book Self-Portrait As Your Traitor was awarded a Gold Mobius, a Print Typography Award, and a medal from the Art Directors Club.

By 2017, Design Matters had passed the five million downloads per year mark. The podcast received a number of awards, including the Cooper Hewitt National Design Award and the People's Design Award. In 2015, iTunes named it one of the best podcasts of the year. It was recognized as a Webby Honoree in 2018.

In 2021, she was named to Fast Company's Queer 50 list.

Advocacy
Millman was involved with the creation of the NO MORE movement and worked on the team to design a new visual symbol to express universal support for ending domestic violence and sexual assault. The purpose of the symbol is to raise visibility, create awareness, encourage conversation, and help break the social stigma surrounding domestic violence and sexual assault. The NO MORE movement has been supported by a broad coalition of funders, advocacy and service organizations, and private sector volunteers from leading corporations and media companies including Mariska Hargitay's Joyful Heart Foundation, Avon, Kimberly Clark Corporation and Verizon. Millman is also on the board of the Joyful Heart Foundation and created the identity for the non-profit with her students at the School of Visual Arts.

Personal life
Millman is married to author Roxane Gay. On July 9, 2020 Gay tweeted that they had already eloped but planned to have a proper ceremony officiated by Gloria Steinem in 2021.

Bibliography
Millman is the author of seven books. Two are collections of interviews that have extended the ethos and editorial vision of Design Matters to the printed page: How to Think Like a Great Graphic Designer and Brand Thinking and Other Noble Pursuits. She is the author of two books of illustrated essays: Look Both Ways and Self-Portrait As Your Traitor.
 
 
 
 
 
 
Upcoming:

Further reading
 Gerda Breuer, Julia Meer (ed): Women in Graphic Design, p. 515/516, 562/563, Jovis, Berlin 2012, 
 Gomez-Palacio, Bryony, and Armin Vit. Women of design: influence and inspiration from the original trailblazers to the new groundbreakers., p. 175–177, How Books, 2008,

References

External links 
 
Debbie Millman on This Design Life 
Debbie Millman on Tim Ferriss show
Debbie Millman on The Great Discontent

1962 births
Place of birth missing (living people)
Living people
20th-century American women artists
21st-century American women artists
21st-century American women writers
American women podcasters
American podcasters
Babson College alumni
School of Visual Arts faculty
American graphic designers
Design writers
American LGBT artists
American women academics
21st-century LGBT people
AIGA medalists
LGBT educators